Christos Georgakis is an American chemical engineer, currently a Distinguished Professor at Tufts University and also a Fellow to the American Association for the Advancement of Science, International Federation of Automatic Control and American Institute of Chemical Engineers. He was previously the du Pont Professor, 1975-76, and Edgerton Professor, 1977-79, at Massachusetts Institute of Technology, the Iacocca Professor at Lehigh University from 2001 to 2002, Othmer Professor at New York University Tandon School of Engineering from 2002 to 2003.

Education
 Ph.D., University of Minnesota, 1975
 M.S., University of Illinois, 1972
 ChE Diploma, National Technical University of Athens, 1970

References

Year of birth missing (living people)
Living people
Tufts University faculty
American chemical engineers
University of Minnesota alumni
University of Illinois alumni
MIT School of Engineering faculty
Lehigh University faculty
New York University faculty
Fellows of the American Association for the Advancement of Science
Fellows of the International Federation of Automatic Control
Fellows of the American Institute of Chemical Engineers